Bipin Singh (also rendered as Vipin Singh) is an Indian politician and a member of 17th Legislative Assembly of Uttar Pradesh of India. He represents the Gorakhpur Rural (Assembly constituency) in Gorakhpur district of Uttar Pradesh and is a member of the Bharatiya Janata Party.

Personal life
Singh was born 10 March 1968 in Gorakhpur of Uttar Pradesh to father Ambika Singh. He graduated with a Bachelor of Arts degree from Gorakhpur University in 1988. Singh married Neeta Singh on 12 July 1992, with whom he has a son and a daughter.

Political career
Singh started his political journey as block pramukh, a post which he held in Kaudiram for 10 consecutive years. In 17th Legislative Assembly of Uttar Pradesh (2017) elections, he got ticket by Bharatiya Janata Party from Gorakhpur Rural (Assembly constituency). He was elected MLA by defeating Samajwadi Party candidate Vijay Bahadur Yadav by a margin of 4,410 votes.

In March 2017, Singh offered his seat to Uttar Pradesh Chief Minister Yogi Adityanath, as he had to become a member of either the Legislative Assembly or the Legislative Council within six months to stay as the Chief Minister of the state.

Posts held

References

Uttar Pradesh MLAs 2017–2022
Bharatiya Janata Party politicians from Uttar Pradesh
Living people
People from Gorakhpur district
1968 births
Uttar Pradesh MLAs 2022–2027